Pardee is a surname. Notable people with the surname include:

Alex Pardee, American Artist
Ario Pardee, American coal magnate, founder of Hazleton, Pennsylvania
Ario Pardee Jr., American Civil War Brevet Brigadier general.
Arthur Pardee, American biochemist
Calvin Pardee
Enoch H. Pardee
Frederick S. Pardee, former economic researcher at the RAND Corporation, real estate investor and philanthropist from Los Angeles, California
George Pardee, 21st Governor of California
Harold Ensign Bennet Pardee, cardiologist
Jack Pardee (1936 - 2013), American football player and coach
Joseph Pardee (1871–1960), American geologist
Sarah Lockwood Pardee (Winchester), Builder of the Winchester Mystery House
Timothy Blair Pardee (1830–1889), Ontario lawyer and political figure
Rudy Pardee, founder of the LA Dream Team